WATB may refer to:

 Turelelo Soa Airport (ICAO code: WATB), an airport in Bajawa, Indonesia
 WATB-LP, an Atlanta, Georgia radio station
 WWSZ (former callsign WATB), an Atlanta-area AM broadcast station licensed to Decatur, Georgia